Scott McGill may refer to:
 Scott McGill (footballer)
 Scott McGill (cyclist)